was a Japanese actor and voice actor who was represented by Tokyo Actor's Consumer's Cooperative Society. He was a graduate of Doshisha University and resided in Osaka Prefecture. He died of acute heart failure on February 22, 2020.

As a voice actor, he was most recognized for his work in the anime series Kinnikuman as Mayumi Kinniku, Neptuneman and several others.

Notable voice work

Animated television series
Gun X Sword (Gadved)
After War Gundam X (Seidel Rasso)
Mobile Suit V Gundam (Lob Olesches)
Kinnikuman (Mayumi Kinniku, Neptuneman, Atlantis, Junkman, Canadianman (eps 68 & 70) etc.)
Future GPX Cyber Formula (Kojirou Sugo)
The Brave Fighter of Legend Da-Garn (Kouichirou Takasugi, Gakusha Robot)
Ginga: Nagareboshi Gin (Musashi)
PaRappa The Rapper (Doberman)
Nintama Rantarou (Kingo's Father, Amanatsu Toukurou)
Burst Angel (Kashocho)
Phoenix (Karō)
Full Metal Panic! (Jerome Borda)
Yawara! A Fashionable Judo Girl (Editor in Chief)
Record of Lodoss War (Greevus)
Code Geass (Genbu Kururugi)
Waka kusa Monogatari (Burns)

OVA
Mobile Suit Gundam 0083: Stardust Memory (Ivan Pasarov)
Armor Hunter Mellowlink (Ganard)

Movies
The Heroic Legend of Arslan (Karikara II)
Mobile Suit Gundam (Lt. Reed)
Doraemon: Nobita and the Kingdom of Clouds (Resentative)
Doraemon: Nobita and the Tin Labyrinth (Professor)
Doraemon: Nobita's Diary of the Creation of the World (Driver)
Kinnikuman Series (Mayumi Kinniku)
Mobile Suit Gundam 0083: The Last Blitz of Zeon (Ivan Pasarav)
Pom Poko (Policeman)

Tokusatsu
Metal Hero Series
Choujinki Metalder
Kidou Keiji Jiban
Tokkei Winspector (1990, 49 episodes) - Madocks (voice)
Special Rescue Exceedraft (1992, Episode 16) - Duke 
Super Sentai Series
Himitsu Sentai Gorenger (1975) - Sakui / Murayama
Taiyo Sentai Sun Vulcan (1981, Episode: 41) - Reporter
Dai Sentai Goggle V (1982, Episode: 19) - Hachi Mozoo (voice)
Dengeki Sentai Changeman (1985-1986) - Marzo / Haust / Ballas / Seala / Girom / Zoll Bass / Kahge / Zados / Jigura / Daryl (voice)
Choujuu Sentai Liveman (1988) - Ikari Zuno / Ken Zuno / Toumei Zuno / Hacker Zuno (voice)
Kousoku Sentai Turboranger (1989) - Yashiki Boma / Kobu Boma / Kaseki Boma / Fujimi Boma / Gunman Boma (voice)
Chikyuu Sentai Fiveman (1990) - Gagargin / Liogin / WaniKaerugin / HyouCobrarugin (voice)
Choujin Sentai Jetman (1991, Episode: 39) - Sniper Cat (voice)
Kyōryū Sentai Zyuranger (1992) - Dora Minotaur / Dokiita Clay Golems / Dora Cockatrice / Dora Endos / Dora Silkis (voice)
Ninja Sentai Kakuranger (1994, Episode: 12) - Tengu (voice)
Denji Sentai Megaranger (1997, Episode: 35) - Mantis Nejilar (voice)
Kyuukyuu Sentai GoGo-V (1999, Episode: 25) - Ceremonal Psyma Beast Halleluyan (voice)
Hyakujuu Sentai GaoRanger (2001, Episode: 35) - Blacksmith Org (voice)
Tokusou Sentai Dekaranger (2004, 8 episodes) - Supreme Commander Horusian Numa-O (voice)
Kamen Rider Series
Kamen Rider Black (1988) - Earwig Mutant / Coelacanth Mutant (voice)
Kamen Rider Black RX (1988-1989) - Strange Demon Robot Cublican / Strange Demon Beast-Man Gaingamoth / Strange Demon Supernatural Clan Zunojin / Strange Demon Robot Tripron 2 / Strange Alien Lifeforms Antront / Strange Demon Beast-Man Gynagingam / Strange Demon Robot Elgitron / Strange Demon Robot Shuraigin / Strongest Inhumanoid Gran Zairus / Riderman / Kamen Rider Super-1 (voice)

Dubbing
Timecop (Senator Aaron McComb (Ron Silver))

References

External links
Kazuhiko Kishino at Haikyo 

Japanese male voice actors
1934 births
2020 deaths
Male voice actors from Tokushima Prefecture
Doshisha University alumni
20th-century Japanese male actors
21st-century Japanese male actors
Tokyo Actor's Consumer's Cooperative Society voice actors